Mehdiabad (also Romanized as Mehdīābād) is a village in Behnamvasat-e Shomali Rural District, in the Central District of Varamin County, Tehran Province, Iran. At the 2006 census, its population was 61, in 15 families.

References 

Populated places in Varamin County